Anthony Keith Gwynn Sr. (May 9, 1960 – June 16, 2014), nicknamed "Mr. Padre", was an American professional baseball right fielder, who played 20 seasons (1982–2001) in Major League Baseball (MLB) for the San Diego Padres. The left-handed hitting Gwynn won eight batting titles in his career, tied for the most in National League (NL) history. He is one of the best and most consistent hitters in baseball history. Gwynn had a .338 career batting average, never hitting below .309 in any full season. He was a 15-time All-Star, recognized for his skills both on offense and defense with seven Silver Slugger Awards and five Gold Glove Awards. Gwynn was the rare player in his era that stayed with a single team his entire career, and he played in the only two World Series appearances in San Diego's franchise history. He was inducted into the Baseball Hall of Fame in 2007, his first year of eligibility.

Gwynn attended San Diego State University (SDSU), where he played both college baseball and basketball for the Aztecs. He was an all-conference player in both sports in the Western Athletic Conference (WAC) but was honored as an All-American in baseball. Gwynn was selected by the Padres in the third round of the 1981 MLB draft as the 58th overall pick. He made his major-league debut the next year and captured his first batting title in 1984 when San Diego advanced to its first-ever World Series. A poor fielder in college, Gwynn's work on his defense was rewarded in 1986 when he received his first Gold Glove. The following year, he won the first of three consecutive batting titles. Beginning in 1990, Gwynn endured four straight injury-shortened seasons. However, he experienced a resurgence with four consecutive batting titles starting in 1994, when he batted a career-high .394 in a strike-shortened season. Gwynn played in his second World Series in 1998 before reaching the 3,000-hit milestone the following year. He played two more seasons, hampered by injuries in both, and retired after the 2001 season with 3,141 career hits.

A contact hitter, Gwynn excelled at hitting the ball to the opposite field. After meeting Hall of Famer Ted Williams in 1992, Gwynn became more adept at pulling the ball and using the entire field, as well as hitting for more power. In his early career years, he was also a threat to steal bases. Widely considered the greatest player in Padres history, Gwynn regularly accepted less money to remain with the small-market team. After he retired from playing, the Padres retired his No. 19 in 2004. Gwynn became the head baseball coach at his alma mater and also spent time as a baseball analyst. He died of salivary gland cancer in 2014 at the age of 54.

Early life
Gwynn was born in Los Angeles, California, to Charles and Vendella Gwynn. At age nine, his parents decided they would move from their apartment and buy a house in nearby Long Beach, a location they chose because of its schools, parks, and youth sports options throughout the year. He grew up with older brother Charles Jr., who played college baseball and became a teacher, and younger brother Chris, who also became an MLB player. Gwynn's parents were civil servants who were tag-team parents. Gwynn's father worked at a warehouse from 7:30a.m. until 5:00p.m., and he also coached Pop Warner football and Little League Baseball; his mother worked at the post office from 5:30p.m. until 3:00a.m. His mother and father instilled in him the value of being prepared. He played mostly basketball, then his favorite sport.

Gwynn's father encouraged his sons to play ball in the makeshift baseball field that he assembled in their backyard. The setup was a narrow strip of grass that was longer than wide. Pulling the ball too much resulted in it being lost over the neighbor's fence, but left field being short ruled out hitting it to the opposite field as well. Once the brothers' supply of wiffle balls was exhausted, they resorted to using a sock rolled in rubber bands, a wad of tape, or a hardened fig from a neighbor's tree. Gwynn could pull the ball in his backyard, but he would naturally hit it the other way during regular games. Growing up, he attended Los Angeles Dodgers games and watched his hero, Willie Davis; the Dodgers outfielder had twice as many stolen bases as home runs (398 SB, 182 HR) in his career. Gwynn admired Davis for being black, left-handed, and "aggressive but under control"; he respected Davis' work habits as well. Unlike other kids that tracked home run hitters, Gwynn checked the box scores in the newspaper every morning to follow high-average hitters like Pete Rose, George Brett and Rod Carew.

High school career
Gwynn attended Long Beach Polytechnic High School, a high-profile sports school. He was a two-sport star in basketball and baseball. In his final two years, his Jackrabbits baseball teams were a combined 3–25–2 in the league, while the basketball teams went 53–6 and twice reached the California Interscholastic Federation (CIF) Southern Section 4A championship game. Gwynn had considered quitting baseball as a senior to concentrate on basketball, but his mother talked him out of it. "She said it might be something down the road and that I might be sorry later if I didn’t play", recalled Gwynn.

As a junior, he was the starting point guard on Poly's basketball team that went 30–1 and won the Southern Section 4A title. The final was played before over 10,000 fans at the Long Beach Arena, where Gwynn scored 10 points in the 69–50 victory over Buena of Ventura. His teammates included Michael Wiley, who became a professional player in the National Basketball Association (NBA). In his senior year, Poly was 23–7, and again advanced to the championship round despite finishing third in the Moore League. Their bid for a second straight title ended with a 57–50 loss to Pasadena. Gwynn averaged 10.3 points and totaled 178 assists for the season, and he was named to the All-CIF Southern Section Second Team. After the season, he switched to baseball, whose season was already well underway. Despite his shortened season, he earned first-team All-Southern Section honors after batting .563. Poly's baseball team's struggles taught him to remain focused, continue executing, and stay productive.

Gwynn received scholarship offers to play college basketball but none for college baseball. He also went unselected in the 1977 MLB draft, which Gwynn attributed to his limited playing time. He wanted to play both sports for Cal State Fullerton, which was okay by basketball coach Bobby Dye, but baseball coach Augie Garrido did not believe an athlete could handle both sports in college. San Diego State basketball coach Tim Vezie wanted Gwynn to commit to playing two years of basketball before playing baseball. Gwynn also had an offer from Texas Christian University (TCU). However, he was told that he would be their first black player in 30 years, which ruled them out from his consideration. He chose to attend SDSU, calling it "the best option I had".

College career
Gwynn was a two-sport star with San Diego State, playing three baseball seasons and four basketball. He was a two-time All-American outfielder in his final two seasons when he led the team in hitting. A skilled playmaker in basketball, he set multiple school records for assists. He is the only player in the history of the WAC to earn all-conference honors in two sports. Gwynn was not allowed to play baseball as a freshman.

By the following season in 1979, Gwynn still had not heard from Aztecs baseball coach Jim Dietz about joining the team after the basketball season. However, an opportunity arose after two outfielders riding bicycles were struck by an automobile and injured, leaving Dietz in need of replacements. Freshman shortstop Bobby Meacham, who played against Gwynn in high school, convinced the coach to give Gwynn a chance. Dietz had never seen Gwynn play but contacted him mostly because he trusted Meacham. Vezie by then had been fired, and his successor, Smokey Gaines, allowed Gwynn to play baseball. Were it not for the accident, Gwynn doubted he would have ever played baseball with SDSU. "Knowing what I now do about Coach Dietz ... [h]e's too loyal to his athletes to have allowed me to walk over after basketball season and join the team", said Gwynn.

In baseball, Gwynn was primarily a left fielder and designated hitter (DH) at San Diego State. He hit .301 in his first season but said he "stunk defensively". In 1980, Gwynn hit .423 with six home runs and 29 runs batted in (RBI) and was named third-team All-American by Baseball News. The following season, he was a first-team All-American after batting .416 with 11 home runs and 62 RBI. He also was named a first-team All-WAC outfielder. In his three years, he had a career average of .398, and the team went 146–61–4.

Playing basketball, Gwynn set Aztecs basketball records for assists in a game (18), season (221), and career (590). He was twice named to the All-WAC Second Team, and he averaged 8.8 points per game his senior year. Playing point guard developed Gwynn's baseball skills, as the dribbling strengthened his wrists—avoiding what he called "slow bat syndrome"—and basketball taught him to be quick, which improved his baserunning. He could dunk a basketball, though he was unable to palm the ball with his small hands. He had a quick first step in either sport and was able to run  in 6.7 seconds.

Gwynn indirectly received exposure from scouts watching SDSU that were interested in Meacham, who would become a first-round pick in 1981. Gwynn had started the baseball season late in 1981, as the basketball team was still competing, and some scouts had already seen enough of Meacham and stopped following SDSU. Also on the Aztecs baseball team was Casey McKeon, son of Jack McKeon, who was the San Diego Padres general manager at the time. Given his son's involvement, McKeon often went to Aztec games. He was initially interested in seeing Meacham but became more impressed by Gwynn after seeing him at an exhibition game between the Aztecs and Padres; Gwynn had re-joined the baseball team five days earlier.

Professional baseball career

Minor leagues (1981–1982)
The Padres selected Gwynn in the third round of the 1981 MLB draft with the 58th overall pick. He had gone to Padres games while he was at San Diego State and would sit there thinking that they had the "ugliest uniforms I've ever seen in my life". Those uniforms again came to his mind after he was drafted. McKeon had wanted to take Gwynn with the Padres' first pick, but they chose two other players in the first round and another in the second. McKeon threatened to walk out of the draft room had San Diego not selected him in the third. Later that day, Gwynn was also selected by the San Diego Clippers in the 10th round of the NBA draft. According to then-Clippers general manager Ted Podleski, Gwynn might have gone as high as the sixth round if he was not a baseball player. Gwynn chose to play baseball with the Padres in what he termed a "practical" decision, citing his physical battles pushing and fighting against larger players such as Charles Bradley while playing WAC basketball.

Coming out of college, Gwynn was initially worried about the transition from using an aluminum bat to a wooden one, but his concerns were allayed once he found a bat comparable to the size he had used with the Aztecs. He led the Northwest League with a .331 batting average, and added 12 homers and 17 stolen bases in just 42 games for Walla Walla, San Diego's Class A minor league affiliate, earning him the league's most valuable player (MVP) award in 1981. He finished the season in Class AA with Amarillo for 23 games while batting .462.

Major leagues (1982–2001)

1982–1983

Gwynn participated at spring training with San Diego in 1982 and hit an impressive .375. However, the Padres were set in the outfield with veterans Gene Richards, Ruppert Jones, and Sixto Lezcano, and Gwynn began the season with Triple-A Hawaii. He was batting .328 in 93 games with the Islanders when he was promoted and debuted for the Padres on July 19, 1982. He started in center field against the Philadelphia Phillies in place of a slumping Jones. In his fourth at-bat, Gwynn got his first major league hit—a double—against reliever Sid Monge. Rose, the Phillies' first baseman and later became the major-league all-time hit leader, told Gwynn, "Congratulations. Don't catch me in one night." Five weeks later against Pittsburgh, Gwynn injured his left wrist after diving for a ball and hitting the hard artificial turf at Three Rivers Stadium, and missed three weeks while on the disabled list (DL). He finished his rookie season batting .289 in 54 games, the only season he hit below .300. His 15-game hitting streak was the longest on the team that season.

Gwynn reinjured his wrist playing winter ball in Puerto Rico and started 1983 on the DL. He missed the first two months of the season and struggled after his return. His average fell as low as .229 by July 29. He asked his wife to record the games before a road trip, and he began using video recording to review his at-bats. After looking at the tapes and correcting his swing during batting practice, he became a believer in using video. He said video "turned around my career". He heated up to a .309 average for his shortened season, and his 25-game hitting streak set a Padres record. For the second straight season, San Diego finished with a .500 record.

1984–1986

In his first full season in 1984, San Diego won their first NL West title. Gwynn was elected to start in his first All-Star Game, and he won his first batting title with a .351 average along with 71 RBIs, and 33 stolen bases; he had only 23 strikeouts in 606 at-bats. He finished third in the balloting for the National League MVP behind Chicago Cubs winner Ryne Sandberg and runner-up Keith Hernandez of the New York Mets. He had 213 hits, breaking the Padres record of 194 set by Richards in 1980. Gwynn hit second in the Padres batting order behind Alan Wiggins, and benefited from the higher number of fastballs opposing pitchers threw in response to the speedy leadoff hitter (70 SB) being on base. Wiggins' speed also disrupted the defense and opened up holes that Gwynn was able to exploit for hits. He hit above .400 when Wiggins was on base ahead of him. "Anybody can hit a fastball", said Gwynn. The duo was one of the biggest reasons behind San Diego's success. They could score fast with Wiggins getting on first, stealing second, and Gwynn singling him home. Gwynn batted .410 with runners in scoring position, and Manager Dick Williams said his records indicated that Gwynn had the best "RBI percentage" on the team.

In the playoffs, the Padres won the first NL pennant in its team history, defeating the Cubs in the National League Championship Series (NLCS) before losing the World Series to the Detroit Tigers. Gwynn batted .368 in the NLCS, and his one-out single in the bottom of the ninth in Game 4 set up Steve Garvey's game-winning homer. Gwynn hit .263 (5-for-19) in the World Series, and flew out to Tigers left fielder Larry Herndon for the final out of the fall classic. During the offseason, Gwynn took less money to stay in San Diego by signing a six-year, $4.6 million contract with the Padres. Still, his new salary of more than $500,000 salary for 1985 represented a sizable raise over the $180,000 he would have received, or the $100,000 he had received in 1984.

Wiggins entered drug rehab in 1985 and was traded later in the season to the Baltimore Orioles, resulting in Gwynn seeing fewer fastballs and more breaking balls. Gwynn said it took him a month to realize the opponents' strategy change and a while to adjust. His average was under .300 into June when he got hot but then sprained his wrist on June 27 in a collision with Dodgers catcher Mike Scioscia. Still, Gwynn was named with seven other Padres to the 1985 All-Star Game. San Diego then led the NL West but finished the season in third place. After Gwynn's wrist healed, he hit .339 after the start of August and finished the season with the fourth-highest average in the NL (.317). Without an adequate replacement for Wiggins batting leadoff, his RBIs fell to 46.

Gwynn played a career-high 160 games in 1986, when he led NL position players in Wins Above Replacement (WAR). He scored 100 runs for the first time and tied for the NL lead (107). He set then-career highs for doubles (33), homers (14), and steals (37). On September 20 against the Houston Astros, he had four hits and became the fifth NL player that century with five stolen bases in a game. He finished third in hitting (.329) after leading for most of the season. He hit only .296 in September, and he regretted paying too much attention to Tim Raines and Steve Sax, who were previously trailing him. Gwynn was honored for his defense with his first Gold Glove after leading the league in total chances and putouts (337). His 19 outfield assists that year--one short of the league-high--were highlighted by the three Mets he threw out in one game.

1987–1989
Despite his financial problems and bankruptcy in 1987, Gwynn remained unfazed on the field. In the Padres' home opener, Marvell Wynne, Gwynn, and John Kruk hit back-to-back-to-back homers to start the game for San Diego, the first time an MLB team had led off a game with three consecutive home runs. In June, he had 44 hits in 93 at-bats for a .473 average, the best month in his career. He finished fifth among NL outfielders voting for the All-Star game, which Padres manager Larry Bowa called "a joke". However, Gwynn was unperturbed: "People put a premium on the home-run hitters. I know what I am. I’m a contact hitter and not a home-run hitter ... I’m not going to try to be something I’m not."

That year, Gwynn had two five-hit games, the first of eight in his career. He won his second batting title that season after hitting .370. It was the highest average in the NL since Stan Musial hit .376 in 1948. He also stole 56 bases and became the first NL player to hit .370 and steal 50 bases. Gwynn never went more than eight at-bats without recording a hit, and he had a hit in 82 percent of the 155 games he batted. His 218 hits also led the league. He led the league in WAR, and was second in stolen bases, triples (13), and on-base percentage (OBP) (.447); he also ranked fourth in runs scored (119) and 10th in walks with a career-high 82. His average, hits, runs, and triples were all Padre records. Although he only hit seven homers, Gwynn was second in the league with 26 intentional walks, which was indicative of the reverence for his hitting prowess. He finished eighth in the voting for NL MVP but resisted altering his hitting style to hit more home runs to earn more respect. The same year, Wade Boggs in the American League (AL) won his fourth batting title in five years, hitting .363 with 24 home runs, but finished ninth in MVP voting.

During the last three months of the 1987 season, a finger on Gwynn's left hand would lock when he gripped a bat. It would open barely enough for the bat to slip out of his grip. He had surgery on the hand during Spring training the following season. Early in 1988, Gwynn was on the DL for 21 days after spraining his thumb after tripping rounding first base in Pittsburgh. He hit .246 as late as July 2, 1988, but won the batting title with a .313 average. Gwynn batted .406 in July and .367 in the last 73 games of the season. He denied that injuries impacted his hitting, instead attributing his struggles to "mechanics". He struck out a career-high 40 times that season, while his .313 average was the lowest to win a title in NL history. In the 112 years before, only nine batting leaders hit below .330, the previous low being Larry Doyle's .320 in 1915. For the 25 years ending in 1988, batting leaders averaged .343. Gwynn hit 119 points higher with runners on base (.382) than with the bases empty (.263), the largest differential in the NL that season. He tied Pedro Guerrero for the highest average with runners in scoring position (.371). During the season, McKeon replaced Bowa as Padres manager and moved Gwynn from right to center field. Gwynn also reached 1,000 career hits on April 22 with a single off Nolan Ryan of the Astros. On September 17, he passed Dave Winfield as the Padres' career leader in hits with his 1,135th off Jim Acker of the Atlanta Braves.

In the 1989 season, he was hurting in September while in the race for another batting title. His right toe made it hard for him to put a shoe on, and his left Achilles tendon was sore, preventing him from pushing off properly when swinging. His batting average dropped, but he insisted on playing until his manager forced him to sit out for two games. The Padres were battling the San Francisco Giants for the division title in September, but they were eliminated from contention the game before hosting a season-ending three-game series with the Giants. Although the race for the division was over, Gwynn was still trailing San Francisco's Will Clark for the batting title, .333 to .332. Gwynn went 3-for-4 in the last two games, finishing at .336 to claim his third title. "I lost to the best", Clark said. Gwynn became the first NL player to win three consecutive batting titles since Musial in 1950–52. In December 1989, Gwynn fell to being the seventh-highest-paid Padre at $1 million a year and questioned the team's salary structure. He felt he deserved more money than players like Jack Clark, who signed a lucrative deal with the New York Yankees before being traded to San Diego. Gwynn's request for a contract renegotiation was denied.

1990–1992

Widely respected by his peers and known as one of the most dedicated players in baseball, Gwynn in 1990 was accused by some teammates of being selfish and caring more about his batting average than winning. First baseman Jack Clark, most notably, stated that Gwynn should be swinging with runners in scoring position instead of bunting and protecting his batting average. Clark did not approve of Gwynn bunting with runners on first and second with nobody out, believing he was trying to either bunt for a hit or get credit for a sacrifice if he failed. On the other hand, Gwynn felt he was advancing runners for the team's "game changers"—Clark and Joe Carter—which was consistent with McKeon's style. Gwynn said he resorted to bunting to advance the runners because he was not a good pull hitter. "No one bothers Tony Gwynn because he wins batting titles, but the Padres finish fourth or fifth every year", said Clark, who also stirred controversy on his prior teams. Teammates Mike Pagliarulo and Garry Templeton sided with Clark, who also said Gwynn was " overweight", leading to his lower stolen base total.

Stung by the criticism, Gwynn was miserable the rest of the season and became withdrawn and distrustful among his teammates. Conscious of being perceived as selfish, he altered his hitting style by attempting to pull the ball to move runners in situations where he would normally hit to the opposite field. Rumors that he might be traded affected his play. In September, Gwynn was upset when a figurine of his likeness was hanging in effigy in the Padres' dugout, and race became an issue due to the undercurrent of lynchings being evoked with Gwynn being black and Clark being white. The Padres said a groundskeeper was responsible, but Gwynn believed it was a cover-up. Clark denied any involvement. After breaking his right index finger mid-month in Atlanta while trying to make a catch at the wall, Gwynn missed the final 19 games of the season. He left the team for the season to avoid contact with the media and teammates. He was further upset that neither management nor other teammates came to his defense at the time. He later regretted saying he wanted to avoid his teammates in general instead of being more specific which ones he was referring to. "It just involved one great guy, and that's Tony Gwynn, and anything they want to say about Tony Gwynn is going to be news. It got all blown out of proportion", Carter said. Gwynn countered, "I've been doing the same things my whole career, playing the same way. Now, why is it an issue? Because Jack Clark says it is." Gwynn finished the season batting .309, ranking sixth in the league but the lowest average of any full season in his career; he had entered the season with a .332 career average. However, his 72 RBI that season were a then-career high. He also began experiencing soreness and swelling in his left knee. The cartilage under his kneecap was wearing out, which doctors attributed to his playing basketball and baseball year-round for seven years from high school through college.

Gwynn and Clark said they could continue to play together, but Clark signed with the Boston Red Sox as a free agent in the offseason. Gwynn felt appreciated after he was signed to a three-year contract extension for $12.25 million, including a $1 million signing bonus. McKeon praised Gwynn, saying, "He's one of the most unselfish players I've ever managed. In '89, when he was going for a batting title, he was giving himself up to move runners along." Dick Williams, who managed Gwynn from 1982 through 1985, said of Gwynn, "I don't think I've ever had a player who worked harder, cared more and was more deserving of his awards." Clark continued criticizing him, which Gwynn attributed to jealousy. In response, Gwynn knocked Clark: "Let's talk about him walking 104 times, being a No. 4 hitter. Let's talk about his not flying on team flights. Let's talk about him getting booted out of games on a called strike three." In 1992, Gwynn sympathized with Clark, who filed for bankruptcy after bad loans by his agent. "I really appreciated the things Tony said about my situation", Clark said.

Gwynn, in 1991, passed Gene Richards as the Padres' all-time leader in steals and triples. He reached a season-high batting average of .373 in June, and late in the month was among the league leaders in RBIs. His left knee began causing him problems before the All-Star break, and he had been suffering from shin splints as well. He injured his left knee on August 5 at Houston while sliding into second base. He played through the injury, missing just one game over the next  weeks. He had fluid drained from his knee on August 31 and played just once in the week that followed while surgery was discussed. He attempted to finish the season but lasted just five more games. He underwent arthroscopic surgery to clean out the knee and smooth the articular cartilage, missing the final 21 games of the year. Gwynn led the league in hitting at .326 late in August and had enough plate appearances already to qualify for the title, when many people—including his father and Padres announcer Jerry Coleman—advised him to take care of his knee and secure another batting title. However, Gwynn was still reeling from Clark's criticism of his conditioning and selfishness and wanted to continue playing. Gwynn finished the season ranked third in batting at .317, behind Terry Pendleton (.319) and Hal Morris (.318). After the All-Star Game, he hit just .243.

In 1992, Gwynn ended the season on the DL for the third straight year. On September 8, in a 16-inning game in San Francisco, he had the third five-hit game of his career and his first since 1987. In the same game, he sprained the medial collateral ligament in his left knee and played just four more innings the rest of the season. He required arthroscopic surgery on the knee. Gwynn met Hall of Famer Ted Williams for the first time during the 1992 All-Star Game, which was hosted at San Diego Jack Murphy Stadium (known later as Qualcomm Stadium). At the time, Gwynn considered himself to be an accomplished hitter, content to hit singles and doubles. Williams called Gwynn "a big guy" and challenged him to hit for more power. He chided Gwynn for using a "toothpick" for a bat. His encounter with Williams spurred him to think more about hitting, and he began to hit for more power. "I've never been a home run guy, never been a big RBI guy, but from that point to the end of my career, I was much better at it", said Gwynn.

1993–1997
Gwynn entered the 1993 season anticipating that he would be better after his past two surgeries, and he had also incorporated Williams' advice into his swing. The Padres lost 101 games that year for the team's worst record during his career. They finished last in the division, behind even the Colorado Rockies, who were an expansion team in their inaugural season. San Diego that season had traded most of its star players—including Fred McGriff, Gary Sheffield, and Tony Fernández—in fire sales. Gwynn finished with a .358 average, the then-second best average of his career, but Colorado's Andrés Galarraga won the title at .370. Gwynn batted .587 on pulled balls, compared to his .315 in 1991 before Williams' pointers. He was affected early in the season by a sprained thumb, but he hit .400 (76-for-190) over the second half of the season. On June 10, Gwynn missed the opportunity to hit for the cycle when manager Jim Riggleman replaced him in the seventh inning of a 14–2 rout against the Dodgers after he had hit for a home run, double, and triple in his three prior at-bats. Riggleman was not aware that he needed a single to complete the cycle. Still wary of Clark's earlier criticism that he was selfish, Gwynn did not contest his removal, which angered his manager when he found out after the game. On August 4 against the Giants, Gwynn had the only six-hit game of his career. He might have gone 7–for–7 if not for an excellent play at first base by Will Clark. Gwynn recorded his 2,000th hit with a single off Colorado lefthander Bruce Ruffin on August 6. His last game was September 5 before undergoing arthroscopic surgery to clear "loose bodies" from his knee. It was the fourth consecutive year his season ended early, and the third straight season it was due to left knee surgery.

After the season, Gwynn's father, Charles, died of heart problems at the age of 57. Two days earlier, Charles had argued with Gwynn that he should leave San Diego, questioning the Padres' commitment to winning. Gwynn eventually concluded, "No, I like it here, I should stay." He contemplated leaving baseball after his father's death; however, he recalled his father always telling him to "never be a quitter, work hard".

For years during Gwynn's career, media preseason predictions declared that "this season" he would become the first player to hit .400 since Williams in 1941. Relatively healthy in 1994, Gwynn batted .394, his career-high and the highest in the National League since Bill Terry hit .401 in 1930. He also had a league-leading .454 OBP. From April 22 through the 24 against Philadelphia, he had eight consecutive hits and reached base nine straight times, tying Padres records held by Winfield and Bip Roberts, respectively. Gwynn was batting .383 at the All-Star break; however, talk of a strike by the Major League Baseball Players Association (MLBPA) was looming, and he wanted to get to .400 before that date. He hit .423 over 28 games in the second half, and heated up to .475 though 10 games in August, when the season ended prematurely on August 11 due to the baseball strike. He was 6-for-9 in the last two games and 3-for-5 in the eventual finale, falling short of batting .400 by three hits. Fans were awaiting an end to the strike and for Gwynn to resume his quest for .400, but hopes of the season restarting were dashed when the World Series was canceled. He later commented, "I'm not unhappy or bitter that the strike came. I look at it this way: I would have sooner fell short due to the strike than if I would have hit .400 and then the strike came. Then people would have thought I would have collapsed down the stretch, instead of being at .390 when the strike came and being so close." That year, Gwynn pulled the ball with greater regularity. He was 10th in the league with a slugging percentage of .568, which was also his career-high. His 12 homers in 419 at-bats was a higher rate than in 1986, when he hit a then-career high 14 homers in 642 at-bats. He won another batting title (.368) in 1995. For the second straight year, he did not go longer than two games without a hit. He led the NL in batting with runners in scoring position (.394), and he had a then-career high 90 RBI. Gwynn hit in 15 straight games in July, his longest hitting streak since his 18-game run in 1988. He hit 28-for-65 (.431) with 15 RBI during the streak. Although he missed batting .400 in 1994, he batted .403 during a 179-game stretch between July 3, 1993 and May 9, 1995.

In 1996, the Padres won the division with 91 wins and returned to the playoffs for the first time in 12 years. Gwynn called it the worst injury season of his career. His hurt heel in April was diagnosed as an inflamed bursa sac. He tried multiple shoes to alleviate the pain, and was on the DL for a month at midseason. He played the rest of the year in pain, and surgery after the season revealed a 40 percent tear (or fraying) at the top of his right Achilles' tendon. On September 28, Gwynn hit a patented single between third base and shortstop to score two runs and break a 2–2 tie in the eighth against the Dodgers, clinching a playoff berth for the Padres. He called it his most memorable regular-season hit until his 3,000th career hit. Gwynn's brother, Chris, also played for San Diego that season and hit the game-winner in the season finale in extra innings, completing a three-game sweep over Los Angeles to win the division. Chris had only hit .169 entering the game, and some fans were convinced that he was on the team only because of his brother. Earlier in the week, Gwynn had criticized fans for booing his brother. "Today, I'm just Chris Gwynn's anonymous brother," said Gwynn, who also won his seventh batting title that day. Although he was four plate appearances (PAs) short of the minimum to qualify for the title, MLB Rule 10.22(a)—which also came to be known as the Tony Gwynn rule—allowed hitless at-bats to be added to his record to qualify. Gwynn, who batted .353 in 498 PAs, would have dropped to .349 with the extra at-bats, still five points better than second-place Ellis Burks' .344. In the postseason, the Padres were swept by the St. Louis Cardinals in the opening round.

In April 1997, Gwynn signed a three-year contract extension for $12.6 million. Recovered from his Achilles problem the year before, he was able to plant his front foot to pull inside pitches. That season, Gwynn reached career highs with 17 home runs and 119 RBIs. He batted .372 for his eighth batting title, second only to Ty Cobb (12). He led the NL in hits for the seventh time, tying Rose's record. The 220 hits led the majors and was a new team record. Gwynn led the majors with a .459 average with runners in scoring position. In his 16th season, he became the oldest major leaguer at age 37 to reach 100 RBIs for the first time. His RBI total was the second-highest in club history. He also hit a Padres record of 49 doubles, ranking second in the league, and established a career-best of 324 total bases. On June 7, Gwynn hit his 100th career home run off of Donne Wall of Houston, becoming the third Padre to reach the mark. He was batting .402 on July 14, the latest in the season he had ever been at .400. However, his average tailed off as he suffered from kidney stones later in the month, and he also battled problems with his left knee that required postseason surgery.

1998–2001
In 1998, Gwynn batted .321 and helped the Padres win a franchise-record 98 games and their second pennant. He began the year with his first-ever opening-day home run, and continued his trend of hitting for more power with 16 homers for the season. The Padres reached the World Series in 1998 after defeating Houston and Atlanta in the playoffs. However, the Padres lost to the Yankees in a four-game sweep, despite Gwynn hitting .500 (8-for-16) in the series; the rest of the team batted only .203. Gwynn hit a home run off the second-deck facade in the opening game at Yankee Stadium against pitcher David Wells, which he called his favorite hit and highlight of his career. "That's the biggest game in the world, a World Series game. And the fact that it was in New York in Yankee Stadium. I'll remember that forever", he said.

Calf injuries forced Gwynn to miss 44 games in the first half of 1999. At the 1999 All-Star Game at Fenway Park in Boston, he escorted Williams to the mound, and steadied his friend in throwing out the ceremonial first pitch. It was Gwynn's most memorable All-Star moment in his career. As he approached 3,000 career hits in July, two unidentified Padres said there was too much focus on reaching the milestone. Additionally, Jim Leyritz, after being traded from the Padres to the Yankees, said Gwynn lacked the "intangibles" of a team player. In the next game in San Diego, Padres fans gave Gwynn a standing ovation after he was removed for a pinch runner following his 2,994th hit. He approached 3,000 hits on the road, first playing in a series against the Cardinals. On August 4, he collected three hits, including a grand slam, to reach 2,998 hits, receiving a standing ovation from the St. Louis crowd after each hit. The following day, Gwynn collected hit number 2,999 in the same game that the Cardinals' Mark McGwire hit his 500th home run. Gwynn got his 3,000th hit on August 6 with a single in the first inning off Montreal Expos pitcher Dan Smith. He had four hits in the game. His 2,000th hit was also on August 6, which is also the birthday of Gwynn's mother. The milestone was delayed by a left calf injury that season which sent him to the DL twice, forcing him to miss 44 games. He reached 3,000 in 2,284 games, the third-fewest games among the 22 players to reach the mark behind Cobb (2,135) and Nap Lajoie (2,224). No player born after 1900 got there in fewer games or at-bats (8,874) than Gwynn.

Gwynn, who turned 40 in 2000, had a left knee injury that required his knee to be drained seven times before he underwent season-ending surgery. He was limited to playing just 36 of the Padres' first 71 games, and he started only 26 games in right field. He batted .408 from May 19 to June 23 to raise his average from .196 and finish the season at .323. Gwynn had microfracture surgery performed on his knee, which involved tiny holes being created to promote cartilage growth.

The Padres bought out their $6 million option on Gwynn for 2001, paying him $2 million instead, and he became a free agent for the first time. After weeks of negotiation that were at times bitter, Gwynn re-signed with the Padres for 2001, agreeing to a one-year, $2 million contract with a chance to earn another $3.7 million in performance incentives. However, he was hampered that season by problems to his right leg, which had been his "good leg", and was limited to just 17 games on the field. In the first half of the season, he missed 64 games due to a right hamstring that resulted in two stints on the DL. After returning, he began having problems with his right knee. He was limited to pinch-hitting duties and started only one game after mid-July due to a torn meniscus in the right knee. Gwynn formally announced on June 28 that he would retire at the end of the season, and subsequently received an ovation at each stadium the Padres visited. He was honored as a non-playing squad member at the 2001 All-Star Game. During the game, he and Cal Ripken, who had announced his retirement nine days before Gwynn, were presented the Commissioner's Historic Achievement Award by Commissioner Bud Selig. On October 6, 2001, at Qualcomm Stadium, Gwynn had a pinch RBI double off Gabe White of Colorado for the final hit of his career. He considered starting the next day in the final game of the season, but he was not confident he could handle a fly ball. In his final appearance, he pinch hit in the ninth inning, grounding out to shortstop. Although he was limited to only 112 plate appearances, Gwynn finished the season with a .324 average, his 19th consecutive season batting at least .300.

Player profile
Gwynn was an aggressive hitter who was able to expand his hitting zone and frequently hit bad balls that were out of the strike zone. He rarely struck out and generally did not draw many walks. His philosophy was to "see the ball and react". He was less concerned with getting a hit in a particular at-bat and was more focused with being comfortable at the plate, having a fluid swing, and making solid contact. Over the course of the season, he figured it would result in success. Gwynn saw the ball better than any of his peers, identifying the type of pitch as the ball left the pitcher's hand. He rarely recognized the rotation of the ball, and did not look to the pitcher's arm speed for clues. He had excellent 20–10 vision that later decreased to 20–15. Gwynn tried wearing glasses around 1994 but stopped, fearing he "looked like a dork". His peripheral vision allowed him to stare directly at the pitcher and still adjust his hitting based on the defense's setup, even if players shifted before the pitch was released. He would identify gaps in the defense based on where fielders were positioned, and then wait for a pitch which allowed him to hit the ball where he wanted.

Among Gwynn's primary strengths was his patience in allowing the ball to reach the strike zone before starting his swing. His bats were as small as anyone used during his career, and their lightness allowed him to wait longer before committing to his swing; he was rarely fooled by a pitch. Growing up, he was not overparticular about his baseball bats, using anything that was available. Gwynn started with a 34-inch, 32-ounce aluminum bat in college. As a junior, he had to replace it after it got dented, and came across a 32-inch, 31-ounce model that was more to his liking. At his first minor league stop at Walla Walla, the shortest bat they had was 34 inches. To Gwynn's surprise, he uncharacteristically started hitting home runs. On their first road trip to Eugene, Oregon, he acquired a couple of 32-inch bats that he could better handle. In the first 12 years of his MLB career, Gwynn used a 32½-inch, 31-ounce bat. In his final eight years, he employed a 33-inch, 30½-ounce bat. Gwynn wanted his wooden bats light like his aluminum ones in college. Instead of having the barrel of his bats shaved, as many batters do, he had them "cupped", with the end of the barrel hollowed out like the bottom of a wine bottle. His small hands required that he use thin-handled bats. His bat control made him a good hit-and-run batter, although some former teammates complained he would swing for a hit even when a player was trying to steal, depriving his teammate of a stolen base.

Gwynn was able to hit the ball to all fields, but liked to hit balls the opposite way to the left, between third base and shortstop. He dubbed it the "5.5 hole", since baseball scorekeeping designates third base using a 5 and shortstop with a 6. Gwynn preferred an outside pitch, waiting as long as possible and using his strong wrists to quickly hit the ball. He was not considered a home run hitter, reaching double-figures just five times, but he was a gap hitter with power to drive hits between outfielders. Opposing outfielders typically played him deep. Gwynn became a complete hitter after following Ted Willams' advice to drive inside pitches instead of finessing them, which Gwynn learned he could do without sacrificing his average. He initially thought that home runs were "boring", and he concentrated on his craft of making contact. However, Williams said Gwynn was "wasting an opportunity", and convinced him to turn on inside fastballs more and capitalize on his strength and power pitchers pitching him inside. Applying Williams' approach, Gwynn employed the entire field, and was no longer satisfied with mostly hitting to left field. His home runs increased, and he drove in more runs. Forty-three of his 135 career home runs were in his final three full seasons (1997–99). Gwynn credited his later improvement to Williams and his book, The Science of Hitting, which he said that he read "four or five times a year". He and Williams became friends, and they often talked for hours about hitting. Gwynn lamented not having met Williams earlier and possibly adjusting his hitting approach sooner.

Gwynn's physical appearance belied his athleticism. His roly-poly frame was a self-described "body by Betty Crocker", a reference to the food product brand. Towards the end of his breakout season in 1984, he conceded that his "extra weight hasn't helped me. My bat's slower than it has been all year." At the time, he attributed his weight gain to soft drinks: "It's killing me. It's always been a weakness. I've gotta cut down on the soda pop." Jim Murray of the Los Angeles Times opined in 1993 that Gwynn's "deceptive" looks and not "look[ing] the part" contributed to his regularly being overlooked in the voting for league MVP. Gwynn was sensitive about his weight. His knee injuries over his career prompted the Padres organization, media, and fans to question his weight, conditioning, and eating habits. However, he rejected the notion that his weight led to his injuries. Gwynn contended that his weight was only a topic when he was struggling, and not when he was performing. He also believed that the criticism stemmed mainly from his not fitting people's profile of what an athlete should look like. He said he had "a football player's body", with his father, grandfather and brothers also being big. Gwynn said his hitting style put a lot of torque on his knees. He started experiencing problems with his legs in 1986, when he suffered from shin splints. In his career, he had 13 operations, including eight involving his knees. Limited by injuries, he played over 135 games just once in his final 11 seasons. Gwynn used to run a great deal to keep in shape, but his last five years were mostly limited to working out in the gym.

Gwynn was a leading base stealer in the first half of his career. He was also able to hit triples, reaching double figures four times. As he became slower in later years while his body grew and his injuries mounted, Gwynn would anticipate pitchers' moves and would sometimes steal bases by breaking for second base before the pitcher started delivering the ball to the hitter. Defensively, he improved considerably and was among the best right fielders at quickly going to the line, cutting the ball off, and throwing to second base. He worked on his defense, constantly checking right field walls in ballparks to study how balls bounced off them. His running ability also helped him on defense. When he entered the majors, Gwynn was not a very good right fielder nor an accurate thrower. For a long time, he worked on his defense harder than he did his hitting. While he was a natural hitter, he was most proud of his five Gold Gloves, calling his first one from 1986 his most treasured piece of memorabilia. He became a perennial leader in outfield assists. Although his arm was not particularly strong, Gwynn learned to use his body to build momentum into his throws. In college, he could not even throw the ball from center field to second base without it hopping first.

Gwynn was hard-working and renowned for his work ethic and devotion to extra batting practice. On the road, he stayed in his hotel room, studying video of his at-bats or playing video games. In an era before laptops and tablets, Gwynn bought his own video equipment and lugged it from town to town along with tapes of his games. His wife traveled with a Betamax video cassette recorder that was the size of a suitcase to tape his at-bats. Still, the Padres were the last MLB team to hire a video coordinator. Gwynn later invested in close to $100,000 in video equipment that he shared with his teammates. Few hitters were as meticulous as Gwynn with his detailed notebooks and videotape, which he spent hours studying. He studied pitchers, watching them in the bullpen and on television or video, to learn their tendencies on every count. Gwynn spent hours watching video and analyzing his swing frame by frame. He had one tape of each team, which included his at-bats against that team in the season. "Tony taught me more about hitting than I ever taught him", said Merv Rettenmund, his hitting coach for nine years with the Padres.

Gwynn was friendly and accessible to both the media and fans. Even on the occasions that he began an interview tight-lipped, he almost inevitably opened up and offered abundant material. He spoke with a twang in his high-pitched voice, often filled with loud, infectious, childlike laughter. Gwynn possessed a cheerful personality, being friendly towards others while being critical of himself. He considered himself "a good player ... but I knew my place. I was not a game-changer. I was not a dominant player". His demeanor was even-keeled; Rettenmund said, "You couldn't tell if [Gwynn had] gone 3-for-3 or 0-for-3." After his father died in 1993, Gwynn followed his advice and became more outspoken and more of a team leader.

Post-baseball honors

In 1997, SDSU's baseball facility, Smith Stadium, was extensively renovated with $4 million from Padres owner John Moores. At Moores's request, the stadium was renamed Tony Gwynn Stadium.

Gwynn was inducted into the Padres Hall of Fame in 2002, and the team retired his No. 19 in 2004. He was inducted into the California Hall of Fame in 2016.

In 2007, a 9½-foot,  bronze statue of Gwynn was unveiled in the park just beyond Petco Park's outfield in an area named Tony Gwynn Plaza. The address of Petco Park is 19 Tony Gwynn Drive.

In 2014, the Mountain West Conference posthumously renamed its baseball Player of the Year Award to the Tony Gwynn Award. At the 2016 All-Star Game in San Diego, MLB announced that the annual winner of the NL batting title would be known henceforth as the "Tony Gwynn National League Batting Champion".

Hall of Fame

On January 9, 2007, Gwynn was elected to the Baseball Hall of Fame, being selected on 532 out of 545 ballots (97.61%), the seventh highest percentage in Hall of Fame voting history. He was relieved that he did not exceed Tom Seaver's record of 98.8 percent. Gwynn considered his selection to be validation for the value of contact hitters, who are not as celebrated as power hitters. He was inducted alongside Cal Ripken Jr. on July 29, 2007. Ripken and Gwynn are two of the 46 players in the Hall of Fame who played their entire major league career for only one team. Both were elected almost unanimously in their first year of eligibility.

The Gwynn-Ripken induction weekend was notable for a number of attendance records, which were announced during the ceremony. 14,000 people visited the Hall of Fame Museum on July 28, a record number for a single-day. Baseball attendance for all games played on July 28 also set a single-day record. The induction ceremony also had the greatest collection of Hall of Famers present, 53 of the 61 living members. A record crowd estimated at 75,000 attended the induction ceremony, shattering the previous record of 25,000 in 1999. In 2002, Gwynn was also inducted by the San Diego Hall of Champions into the Breitbard Hall of Fame honoring San Diego's finest athletes both on and off the playing surface. A week before his induction, Gwynn appeared on a Wheaties box.

Legacy

Gwynn was a 15-time All-Star, voted 11 times by fans to be a starter. He accumulated 3,141 hits and a career batting average of .338, and hit .371 in two World Series. Gwynn was often lauded for his artistry at the plate, and his Hall of Fame plaque refers to him as "an artisan with the bat". The New York Times called him "arguably the best pure hitter of his generation". Hall of Fame pitcher Greg Maddux, against whom Gwynn had more hits than any other pitcher, called him "the best pure hitter in the game. Easily". A 1997 Sports Illustrated cover declared Gwynn as "The Best Hitter Since Ted Williams". Gwynn won eight NL batting titles, tying him with Honus Wagner for the league record— second only to all-time Major League leader Ty Cobb, who won 12 AL titles. He finished in the top 10 in batting for 15 consecutive seasons. From 1984 though 1997, he finished in the top five in all but one season (1990), when he missed it by one hit. He recorded five of the 14 highest season averages since Ted Williams hit .406 in 1941. Gwynn hit above .300 in an NL-record 19 consecutive seasons, exceeded only by Cobb (23). The only season Gwynn failed to bat .300 was his first, when he hit .289 in 54 games. Seven times he batted over .350, the most of any player since World War II. He was just the fourth player in MLB history to hit above .350 for five consecutive years. During that span (1993–1997), which was preceded by his first meeting with Williams, Gwynn averaged .368 while leading the league each season except 1993, when he hit .358 to finish second. The four consecutive NL batting titles he won starting in 1994 had not been matched since Rogers Hornsby won six straight beginning in 1920. Gwynn is the only major leaguer to win four batting titles each in two separate decades, and he batted .351 over his final 10 seasons. Six times he led the NL in both batting average and hits in a season, and five times he reached the 200-hit milestone.

Gwynn's .338 career average is the highest of any player who began his career after World War II, and ranks 17th all-time; he and Williams are the only ones of the top-17 to play after 1938. Gwynn had the fourth-highest career average of any player with 3,000 hits, and the highest of anyone who was born after 1900. Playing in an era when around 75 batters struck out 100 times in a season, Gwynn never struck out more than 40 times a year. He had eight seasons, including six consecutive, when he had fewer than 20 strikeouts. Ten times in his career he finished the season as the hardest player in the NL to strike out. Since 1975, Gwynn is one of only two players that batted .300 in a season while striking out at most once every 25 at-bats. He struck out only 434 times in his whole career, which averaged out to just once every 21 at-bats, or 29 times per 162 games. He became more difficult to strike out later in his career, even as pitchers were growing bigger and stronger and throwing harder. He struck out three times in a game just once in his career, compared to his 297 career three-hit games. Gwynn is one of five players with more than 500 doubles and fewer than 500 strikeouts in their career and the only Hall of Famer since 1965 to finish his career with more doubles than strikeouts. He did not draw many walks, but drew more walks than strikeouts in every season but his rookie year. Though he was not considered a power hitter, opposing managers chose to intentionally walk him nonetheless. He drew 203 intentional passes during his career, which was 50 percent more than his career home run total.

Gwynn was solid on defense, and won five Gold Gloves in a six-year span. He stole 318 bases in his career, with a high of 56 and a four-year stretch when he averaged 40. Only four players in MLB history had 300 steals and a career batting average of at least .338; Gwynn was the only one of the four to have played since 1928. He was also just the 10th player to retire with over 3,000 hits and 300 steals. Gwynn in 1999 was the first National League player to reach 3,000 hits since Lou Brock in August 1979. Seven American Leaguers reached the mark after Brock and before Gwynn; all but one played at least 400 games as a designated hitter. An NL player could not be a DH until 1997, when it was allowed for the few interleague games that were played in AL parks. Just six of Gwynn's first 3,000 hits came as a designated hitter. "If you want to do it in the National League, you have to play a position", he said. "It's been 20 years since anybody has been able to do it. That tells you how tough it is to do it in this league."

Gwynn was the 11th player to collect all 3,000 hits with one team. George Brett of the Kansas City Royals and Robin Yount of the Milwaukee Brewers were the last to achieve the milestone for one team in 1992. He played his entire career for San Diego, a rarity for his generation in an era of free agency. "In this era it doesn't happen. It takes a little bit of loyalty and luck. It also takes the organization wanting a player to stay with the club", said Gwynn. He regularly took less money to keep his family rooted in San Diego, which prompted criticism from the MLBPA for his setting a lower market value for other star hitters. Gwynn earned $47 million as player, but never received more than $6.3 million in a season, nor signed a contract valued over $12.25 million. Only 17 MLB players have played at least 20 seasons with one club. He is widely considered the greatest Padres player ever. "There's simply no bigger figure in baseball that San Diego's ever had", said former teammate Trevor Hoffman. The San Diego Union-Tribune placed Gwynn No. 1 in their 2014 ranking of the city's most influential sports figures. He eschewed the added fame that might have come from playing elsewhere, opting instead to stay with the small-market team that had just seven winning seasons and three playoff appearances during his two decades with them. Gwynn transcended sports and became a civic icon. "It's rare, and becoming rarer, that one man is so identified with a franchise and a city as Tony is with San Diego and the Padres", said political columnist and baseball writer George Will. Grantland called him "quite simply, one of the most beloved figures in the history of the city of San Diego."

Gwynn's career paralleled that of Wade Boggs, who also debuted in the major leagues in 1982. Gwynn and Boggs were the premier contact hitters in an era dominated by home runs. They both won multiple batting titles—Gwynn's eight to Boggs's five—and each won four straight to join Cobb, Hornsby, and Carew as the only players to do so. Gwynn and Boggs each hit over .350 in four straight seasons, the only players to do so since 1931. They joined Brock and Carew as the only players whose careers ended after World War II who finished with 3,000 hits and fewer than 160 home runs. Gwynn, though, had a career slugging percentage of .459, higher than comparable contemporaries such as Boggs, Brock, Carew, and Rose. Among that group, he had more RBIs (1,138) than everyone but Rose.

Nicknamed "Captain Video", Gwynn used video to study his swing before it became common in baseball. When he began the practice in 1983, MLB teams were years away from using video for scouting. Hoffman said that Gwynn "revolutionized video in baseball". Gwynn prospered during the steroid era of baseball. While other players were transforming their physiques over a single offseason, his body grew pudgier and rounder. Though no longer the base stealer or defensive player he was early in his career, he continued to excel as a hitter. From 1995 through 2001, Gwynn hit a major league leading .350 while power hitters were recording the six highest single-season home run totals in MLB history.

Gwynn placed in the top 10 in voting for the National League MVP seven times in his career, including his only top-five finish in 1984, when he ended up third. In 2005, Sporting News ranked Gwynn No. 57 on the list of their 100 Greatest Baseball Players, and he was nominated as a finalist for the Major League Baseball All-Century Team. However, Gwynn's significance is muted by the non-traditional measurements in sabermetrics, which tends to favor power and the ability to get on base over batting average. As of 2014, his career 65.0 WAR ranked 34th among outfielders, and a few above him had not yet been voted into the Hall of Fame. While he had a first-rate on-base percentage of .388, he was one of only four players to hit .335 or more who did not have career .400 OBP. During his career, he finished in the top-10 in the NL in OBP 10 times. Gwynn's run production was another rap against him. He exceeded 90 RBIs in a season just once, when he had 119 in 1997, but he batted .349 in his career with runners in scoring position. "He was devastating with runners in scoring position. Impossible", former player Eric Davis said.

Despite his fame, Gwynn was renowned for his dignity and modesty. He was honored for his character and humanitarianism with the 1995 Branch Rickey Award, the 1998 Lou Gehrig Memorial Award and the 1999 Roberto Clemente Award, which USA Today called "baseball's Triple Crown of humanity and kindness". Tom Verducci of SI.com called Gwynn "an ambassador not just for the game of baseball but for mankind". Commissioner Selig called Gwynn "the greatest Padre ever and one of the most accomplished hitters that our game has ever known, whose all-around excellence on the field was surpassed by his exuberant personality and genial disposition in life".

Post-playing career

Following his playing career, Gwynn was the baseball head coach at SDSU for 12 seasons, compiling a 363–363 record including three Mountain West Conference championships and three NCAA Tournament appearances. During his last season playing for the Padres in 2001, he lobbied for the coaching position after Jim Dietz announced he would step down after the 2002 season. In September 2001, Gwynn signed a three-year contract with his alma mater to be an unpaid volunteer coach for 2002 with a base salary of $100,000 starting in 2003. In the five-year period 2007–2011, the baseball team was penalized with a reduction in scholarships for failing to meet the NCAA's Academic Progress Rate. However, Gwynn's teams improved their academic performance for the five years ending in 2012. The Aztecs finished .500 or better in five of Gwynn's final seven seasons, and they qualified for the NCAA Tournament three times in his final six seasons. As the Aztecs' coach, Gwynn oversaw the development of future major leaguers such as Justin Masterson and Stephen Strasburg, the No. 1 overall draft pick in 2009.

Gwynn's bout with cancer caused him to miss time intermittently. He missed the start of the 2012 season after undergoing surgery, and missed games in 2013 while involved with a clinical trial. Days before his death in June 2014, he was given a one-year contract extension although he had been on a leave of absence since March while recovering from cancer treatment.

Gwynn was also a broadcaster, working as a game and studio analyst for ESPN. He also worked postseason games on TBS, and served as an expert analyst for Yahoo! Sports. He also served as color analyst for Padres games on Channel 4 in San Diego and later Fox Sports San Diego.

In May 2012, Gwynn joined a group led by movie producer Thomas Tull to bid on purchasing the Padres from Moores. Gwynn had no financial stake in the group, and Tull withdrew his bid in June.

Head coaching record

Personal life
Gwynn was married to Alicia Gwynn, and was the father of R&B singer Anisha Nicole and major league outfielder Tony Gwynn Jr., whose major league debut (with the Milwaukee Brewers) and first major league hit on July 19, 2006, came 24 years to the day after his father's first major league hit—each Gwynn hit a double. Gwynn's brother, Chris, was also a major league outfielder. Both Chris and Tony Jr. played with the Padres during their careers. Until Gwynn's death he split time between homes in Poway, California, and Fishers, Indiana.

In 1997, Gwynn noticed forgeries of his signature on Padres memorabilia in an official team store in Encinitas, California. After alerting MLB management, he assisted the FBI in verifying his signature and identifying fake autographs during their nationwide Operation Bullpen, which hunted down rings of memorabilia forgers.

Health problems
Gwynn had three procedures to remove noncancerous growths from his parotid gland beginning in 1997. In 2010, he was diagnosed with cancer of a salivary gland and had lymph nodes and tumors from the gland removed. The operation left his face partially paralyzed on the right side, leaving him unable to smile. Later that year, he underwent eight weeks of chemotherapy and radiation treatments. He was declared cancer free afterwards, and also regained his ability to smile. Additional surgery was performed in 2012 to remove more cancerous growth and address nerve damage. Gwynn attributed the cancer to the dipping tobacco habit that he had since playing rookie ball in Walla Walla in 1981. Doctors, however, stated that studies had not linked parotid cancer with use of chewing tobacco.

He did not closely adhere to the diet, and his weight loss began to stall. In 2010, his weight problem led to a slipped disc in his back that affected a nerve down his leg. He needed a walker before he had the damaged disc removed to cure the pain while walking. Later, he experienced a loss of taste for food during radiation therapy for his cancer, and while being limited to a liquid diet, he lost , all of which he regained after he resumed eating solid foods.

Death
During another round of cancer treatments in April 2014, a mishap occurred in which Gwynn lost oxygen and was barely able to move. He was sent to rehabilitation to learn how to walk again. On June 16, 2014, Gwynn died at Pomerado Hospital in Poway of complications from his cancer. He was 54 years old. The night before, on Father's Day, he had gone into cardiac arrest, and he was rushed from his home to the hospital.

A public memorial service was held for Gwynn at Petco Park on June 26, 2014. The service was attended by 23,229 fans, who heard tributes to Gwynn from baseball and civic leaders, and from Gwynn's family.

On May 9, 2017, a memorial statue in his honor was unveiled at Lake Poway.

In 2018, Gwynn's family reached a confidential settlement with the U.S. Smokeless Tobacco Company after filing a wrongful death lawsuit against the company in 2016, charging that Gwynn had become "hopelessly addicted" to its products.

Baseball achievements

Awards and honors

Records

Career statistics
 Bold indicates Padres all-time leader

Publications

See also

 DHL Hometown Heroes
 List of Major League Baseball annual runs scored leaders
 List of Major League Baseball career batting average leaders
 List of Major League Baseball career doubles leaders
 List of Major League Baseball career runs batted in leaders
 List of Major League Baseball career runs scored leaders
 List of Major League Baseball career stolen bases leaders
 List of Major League Baseball career total bases leaders
 List of Major League Baseball hit records
 List of Major League Baseball players who spent their entire career with one franchise
 List of Major League Baseball single-game hits leaders
 List of San Diego Padres team records
 List of San Diego State University people
 Major League Baseball titles leaders
 San Diego Padres award winners and league leaders

Notes

References

Further reading
Mitchell, Jane. One on One: My Journey With Hall of Famers, Fan Favorites, And Rising Stars. Sweet Dreams Publishing, 2010. .

External links

Tony Gwynn at SABR (Baseball BioProject)

, video feature on Gwynn's Hall of Fame induction and death

1960 births
2014 deaths
African-American baseball players
African-American basketball players
Amarillo Gold Sox players
Baseball players from Long Beach, California
Baseball players from California
Basketball players from Long Beach, California
Basketball players from Los Angeles
Deaths from cancer in California
Deaths from salivary gland cancer
Gold Glove Award winners
Hawaii Islanders players
Las Vegas Stars (baseball) players
Major League Baseball broadcasters
Major League Baseball players with retired numbers
Major League Baseball right fielders
National Baseball Hall of Fame inductees
National League All-Stars
National League batting champions
San Diego Clippers draft picks
San Diego Padres announcers
San Diego Padres players
San Diego State Aztecs baseball coaches
San Diego State Aztecs baseball players
San Diego State Aztecs men's basketball players
Silver Slugger Award winners
Walla Walla Padres players
Sportspeople from Long Beach, California
Point guards
People from Poway, California
People from Fishers, Indiana
American men's basketball players
20th-century African-American sportspeople
21st-century African-American people
Long Beach Polytechnic High School alumni